Eric O'Keefe (born March 11, 1961) is an American author, editor, and journalist based in Texas. His most recent book is the Palm Beach polo murder mystery The Perfect 10. He authored the book The Cup and co-wrote the screenplay for the Village Roadshow feature film The Cup. O'Keefe has served as the editor-in-chief of The Land Report since its founding in 2007. In January 2021, The Land Report published O’Keefe’s investigative report on the extensive farmland holdings of Microsoft cofounder Bill Gates. His cover story revealed Gates to be the largest private farmland owner in the United States with 242,000 acres in 16 states in 2020.

Author

The Perfect 10 (2020) is O'Keefe's most recent book and his first work of fiction. The Palm Beach murder mystery follows West Point graduate Rick Hunt, a White House Fellow assigned to the Chief of Staff, as he investigates the killing of the world’s greatest polo player, Juancito Harrington. Hunt’s investigation culminates during play in the final of the U.S. Open Polo Championship in Wellington, Florida.

O'Keefe's The Cup (2009) is the story of Damien Oliver's dramatic victory on Media Puzzle in the world's richest and most prestigious two-mile handicap, the Melbourne Cup. The week before the race, Damien's only brother, Jason, died following a track accident in Perth while riding an unraced horse at Ascot Racecourse. The tragedy bore a haunting similarity to the death of their father, Ray Oliver, who died in 1975 after a racing fall in the Boulder Cup in Kalgoorlie. Damien's decision to honor his brother by returning and competing in Australia's greatest race culminated in Media Puzzle's emotion-charged victory, which has been rated one of the memorable moments in Australian sports history. O'Keefe traveled to Australia, Dubai, and Ireland to research The Cup, which was published in Australia by Slattery Media and launched in the Committee Room at Flemington Racecourse on August 4, 2009.

The Cup was made into the feature film The Cup based on a script by O'Keefe and Australian director Simon Wincer. Filmed in Melbourne in 2010 and released in Australia in 2011, the movie was directed by Wincer with Stephen Curry cast as Damien Oliver, Daniel MacPherson as Jason Oliver, Brendan Gleeson as Dermot Weld, and Tom Burlinson as Dave Phillips.

O’Keefe collaborated with T. Boone Pickens to write the Texas oilman’s memoir, The First Billion is the Hardest (2008). O'Keefe has written numerous guidebooks, including the Texas Monthly Guidebook to West Texas and the Big Bend (1995), the Texas Monthly Guidebook to El Paso (1996), and the Lone Star Guide to Big Bend and West Texas (1999). He was a contributing author to the Texas Monthly Guidebook to Texas (1998) and the Lone Star Guide to Texas (1999). He authored The Art of Chuck DeHaan (2005) with photography by Gustav Schmiege.

Editor
In 2006, O'Keefe co-founded The Land Report with Eddie Lee Rider Jr. Known as the Magazine of the American Landowner, the  quarterly magazine and website focus on topics of interest to landowners and those who invest in land. The magazine is best known for its annual survey of America's largest landowners, the Land Report 100.  In his capacity as editor, O'Keefe is regularly called upon to comment on topics pertaining to land and landowners and has been featured in The Washington Post, The Wall Street Journal, and The New York Times.

O'Keefe, who is a registered broker with the Texas Real Estate Commission, serves as the magazine's editor and Rider its publisher. Prior to The Land Report, O'Keefe was lead editor at Cowboys & Indians and Chile Pepper.

In his editorial capacities at The Land Report, O'Keefe has interviewed landowners such as Clint Eastwood, Tom Brokaw, Nolan Ryan, T. Boone Pickens, and Ted Turner. His in-depth profile of Red Emmerson detailed Emmerson's rise from independent sawmill operator in 1949 to America's largest private landowner with 2.33 million acres of timberland in California, Oregon, and Washington.

Journalist
As master of ceremonies at the 2021 Land Investment Expo in Des Moines, O’Keefe interviewed former Iowa Governor Terry Branstad about his tenure as the longest-serving governor in American history as well as his service as United States Ambassador to China from 2017 to 2020. Also at the 2021 Land Expo, O’Keefe interviewed Bill Northey, Under Secretary for Farm Production and Conservation in the United States Department of Agriculture from 2018 to 2021. At the 2022 Land Investment Expo, he interviewed Equity Group Investments chairman Sam Zell.

Since 1996, O'Keefe has freelanced for The New York Times on a wide variety of subjects, including Carl Icahn, the NFL, and Willie Nelson. In 1997, O'Keefe was one of the first journalists to report on the shooting death of 18-year-old Esequiel Hernandez Jr. by Cpl. Clemente Banuelos, a U.S. Marine on a drug interdiction training mission near Redford, Texas. The high school student was the first U.S. civilian killed by active duty military personnel since the Kent State shootings in 1970. O'Keefe also reported for The Times on the 1998 settlement by the Department of the Navy and the Justice Department with the Hernandez family. The shooting subsequently inspired The Three Burials of Melquiades Estrada (2005), a movie directed by and starring Tommy Lee Jones.

Huffington Post, Western Horseman, Cigar Aficionado, and D Magazine are some of the other media to feature O'Keefe's writings, including profiles and interviews of actors, entertainers, authors, business leaders, and political figures such as Hank Aaron, Norman Brinker, George W. Bush, Bill Clinton, Julia Child, Russell Crowe, Billy Crystal, Brian Dennehy, Robert Duvall, Dean Fearing, Kinky Friedman, Memo Gracida, Tommy Lee Jones, Jay Leno, Reba McEntire, Sheikh Mohammed bin Rashid Al Maktoum, Bernadette Peters, Ann Richards, Tom Selleck, Sam Shepard, and Sam Zell.

References

External links
 Eric O'Keefe Website
 The Cup Website
 The Land Report

Living people
1961 births
Rice University alumni
American magazine editors
American male journalists
Writers from Texas
People from Brewster County, Texas
People from Dallas
Journalists from Texas